Bruehl is a surname. Notable people with the surname include: 

Anton Bruehl (1900–1982), Australian-born American photographer
Elisabeth Young-Bruehl (1946–2011), American academic and psychotherapist
Thierry Bruehl (born 1968), French-German theatre, music theatre and film director